John Haggart may refer to:
 John Graham Haggart, member of the Canadian Parliament
 John E. Haggart, member of the North Dakota Senate

See also
 John Hagart, Scottish football player and manager